Acyl-coenzyme A synthetase ACSM3, mitochondrial is an enzyme that in humans is encoded by the ACSM3 gene.

References

External links

Further reading 

 
 
 
 
 
 
 
 

Human proteins